Shaye Boddington (born 20 April 1986) is a New Zealand diver. She competed in the women's 1 metre springboard event at the 2019 World Aquatics Championships. She finished in 26th place in the preliminary round. In the women's 3 metre springboard event she finished in 46th place in the preliminary round.

References

External links
 

1986 births
Living people
New Zealand female divers
Place of birth missing (living people)
Divers at the 2018 Commonwealth Games
Commonwealth Games competitors for New Zealand
20th-century New Zealand women
21st-century New Zealand women